Balkhash may refer to:

Places
 Balkhash (city), a city at lake Balkhash, Kazakhstan
 Balkhash Lake, a lake in Kazakhstan
 Balkhash Airport, an airport near city Balkhash, Kazakhstan
 Balkhash District, a district in Almaty Province, Kazakhstan
 Balkhash-Alakol Basin

Species
 Balkhash perch, a species of perch found in Kazakhstan, Uzbekistan and China
 Balkhash marinka (Schizothorax argentatus), a species of ray-finned fish

Other
 Balkhash, a ship of the Soviet Union, formerly the